Teemu is a Finnish male given name. Notable people with the name include:

Teemu Aalto (born 1978), Finnish professional ice hockey player
Teemu Eronen (born 1990), professional ice hockey defenceman
Teemu Hartikainen (born 1990), Finnish professional ice hockey player
Teemu Kankkunen (born 1980), Finnish footballer
Teemu Kattilakoski (born 1977), Finnish cross country skier who has been competing since 1996
Teemu Kesä (born 1981), Finnish professional ice hockey defenceman
Teemu Laakso (born 1987), ice hockey defenceman
Teemu Laine (born 1982), professional Finnish ice hockey player
Teemu Lassila (born 1983), Finnish professional ice hockey goaltender
Teemu Lehtilä (born 1966), Finnish actor
Teemu Mäki (born 1967), Finnish artist
Teemu Mäntysaari (born 1987), guitarist for the Finnish band Wintersun
Teemu Metso (born 1985), Finnish professional ice hockey player
Teemu Normio (born 1980), Finnish professional ice hockey player
Teemu Nurmi (born 1985), Finnish ice hockey player
Teemu Pukki (born 1990), Finnish footballer who plays as a striker
Teemu Pulkkinen (born 1992), Finnish professional ice hockey winger
Teemu Raimoranta (1977–2003), Finnish metal musician
Teemu Ramstedt (born 1987),) is a Finnish professional ice hockey centre
Teemu Rannikko (born 1980), Finnish professional basketball player
Teemu Rautiainen (born 1992), Finnish professional ice hockey player
Teemu Riihijärvi (born 1977), Finnish former professional ice hockey forward
Teemu Rinkinen, Finnish professional ice hockey forward
Teemu Salo (born 1974), Finnish curler from Hyvinkaa
Teemu Selänne (born 1970), Finnish professional ice hockey winger
Teemu Sippo SCI (born 1947), the former Roman Catholic Bishop of Helsinki
Teemu Summanen (born 1975), Finnish Nordic combined skier
Teemu Tainio (born 1979), Finnish footballer
Teemu Tallberg, Finnish professional ice hockey forward
Teemu Turunen (born 1986), Finnish footballer, who plays as a midfielder
Teemu Virtanen (born 1990), Finnish professional ice hockey player
Teemu Wirkkala (born 1984), Finnish javelin thrower

See also
Tenimyu

Finnish masculine given names